Jacques Louis Valon, Marquis de Mimeure (19 November 1659, Dijon – 3 March 1719)  was a French soldier and poet.

Menin to Louis, Dauphin of France (1661–1711), he entered on a military career and became lieutenant général. Louis XIV of France promoted the territory of Mimeure to a marquisate around 1697 for him.

He wrote many verses which were not printed. Backed by the François Louis de Bourbon-Conti, Madame de Montespan and Nicolas Boileau, he was elected to seat 3 of the Académie française on 2 December 1707. His acceptance speech is said to have been written by Antoine Houdar de la Motte. Valon's last known literary work is a 1715 ode in imitation of Horace. The rue de Mimeure in his birthplace is named after him

References 

1659 births
1719 deaths
Military personnel from Dijon
French Army officers
17th-century French poets
17th-century French male writers
18th-century French poets
French translators
Members of the Académie Française
French male poets
French male non-fiction writers
18th-century French male writers
17th-century French translators
Writers from Dijon